Kandadevi S. Alagiriswamy (1925–2000) was a Carnatic violinist.

Early life 
He was born on April 21, 1925, in the village of Kandadevi near Devakottai, Sivaganga district in Tamil Nadu to Sundararaja Iyengar and Alimelu Ammal.
He initially had his training under his grandfather Srinivasa Iyengar and then under Kandadevi Chellam Iyengar.
He had his advanced training under T. Chowdaiah.

Career 
Alagiriswamy's debut performance was accompanying his guru T Chowdiah's solo concert in Mysore. Thereafter he has accompanied Carnatic music stalwarts of the time including M. S. Subbulakshmi, M. L. Vasanthakumari, P. S. Narayanaswamy and several others.

Overseas performance 
He was the accompanying violinist to M. S. Subbulakshmi when she performed at the Festival of India at London in 1982.
He has accompanied other singers and travelled to various countries including the UK, USA, Japan and many other countries.

Awards and Felicitations 
 Sangeet Natak Akademi Award, 1991
 Kalaimamani Award by Tamil Nadu government, 1978
 Tanti Nada Visarada by Kanchi Kamakoti Peetam.
 Vadya Ratna by Academy of Music and Arts.

Death 
Alagiriswamy died on 13 October 2000 in Chennai. He was 75 years of age.

References

External links 
  - Alagiriswamy accompanying M. S. Subbulakshmi
  - Video showing Alagiriswamy playing the Violin

1925 births
2000 deaths
Carnatic violinists
20th-century violinists
Recipients of the Sangeet Natak Akademi Award